Maladera castanea (now considered Maladera formosae), the Asiatic garden beetle, is a beetle in the family Scarabaeidae native to Japan and China. It was introduced to North America, where it is considered a crop and deciduous leaf (tree leaf) eating pest.
Adults are active in the summer, and can be seen feeding on plant leaves at night or found around porch lights. Adults range in length from 8-11 mm and possess a cinnamon-brown color. Larvae are approximately ¾" long and feed on the roots of various plants.

References

 Bugguide.net. Species Maladera formosae - Asiatic Garden Beetle

Melolonthinae
Insects of China
Insects of Japan